Honaker is a town in Russell County, Virginia, United States. The population was 1,449 at the 2010 census.

History
Honaker was settled as early as 1772 when William Ferrill established a homesite in the area.  During Dunmore's War of 1774 a fort, known as New Garden Fort, was established to protect the settlers from Indian raids.

The Honaker Commercial Historic District was listed on the National Register of Historic Places in 2009.

Geography
Honaker is located in the Clinch River watershed.

According to the United States Census Bureau, the town has a total area of 0.6 square miles (1.4 km2), all of it land.

Demographics

As of the census of 2010, there were 1,449 people and 684 households. The racial makeup of the town was 98.83% White, 0.20% African American, 0.28% Native American, and 0.69% from two or more races. Hispanic or Latino of any race were .35% of the population.

There were 684 households in 2010, out of which 23.39% had children under the age of 18 living with them.  The number of vacant housing in Honaker was 5.59%.  In the town, the population was spread out, with 21.95% under the age of 18, 5.94% from 20 to 24, 12.84% from 25 to 34, 19.81% from 35 to 49, 20.63% from 50 to 64, and 17.05% who were 65 years of age or older.

The median income for a household in the town was $22,969, and the median income for a family was $28,611. Males had a median income of $26,071 versus $17,386 for females. The per capita income for the town was $11,888. About 20.4% of families and 27.2% of the population were below the poverty line, including 41.9% of those under age 18 and 17.2% of those age 65 or over.

Events and attractions
Honaker holds the Honaker Redbud Festival each spring, celebrating its status as "Redbud Capital of the World".

The town is currently undergoing a restoration project in order to make a welcome center, shopping and park.  This project is expected to be completed by mid-2020, however nothing has been done.

References

External links

 Honaker, VA official website

Towns in Russell County, Virginia
Towns in Virginia
Populated places established in 1772
1772 establishments in Virginia